The Patriotic Party of Pridnestrovie (Moldovan Cyrillic: Партидул Патриотик дин Нистрения;) was a political party in Transnistria.

History 
The founding congress of the party was held on 4 August 2006, the most notable attendees of which were the Union of Defenders of Pridnestrovie, the Union of Afghan War Veterans and the Women's League of Pridnestrovie, who all merged into one political party along with a few other smaller groups. The merger was encouraged by Oleg Smirnov, the son of then-President Igor Smirnov, and the party later elected him chairman in an uncontested vote. A political council with 33 members was also created during the congress.

In April 2010, the party agreed to a merger with another pro-Smirnov political party, the Republican Party (created on base of the Republic NGO), to form the Social-Patriotic Party of Pridnestrovie. Vladimir Rylyakov, one of the leaders of the OSTK, became the leader of the new party.

References

External links 
 Patriotic Party of Pridnestrovie (official site)

Political parties in Transnistria
Political parties established in 2006
Russian political parties in Moldova